Sharda is a 1981 Hindi-language drama film, produced by K. K. Talwar on Shiv Kala Mandir banner and directed by Lekh Tandon. It stars Jeetendra, Rameshwari and music composed by Laxmikant–Pyarelal.

Plot
The film begins with an introvert meritorious Indrajeet student, who is brought up with strive of his destitute mother Parvati with extreme morals & ethics. Inder adores her beyond the deity and dedicates his life to her happiness. He triumphs in reaching a top position in a multinational company and soon, he acquires the credence of the proprietor, Mr. Kohli. Once, at a business conference, he forcibly drinks and acquainted with an unsullied worse Sharda. Listening to her story he marries her in a drunken state. The next day, when he realizes the juncture, he gets frightened about his orthodox mother. So, he separately accommodates Sharda and is in a dilemma to either to convince his mother or discard Sharda. Besides, Kohli approaches Parvati to knit his daughter Anita with Inder which gleefully Parvati approves. After a while, Inder identifies the integrity of Sharda and loves her. Unfortunately, Sharda gets aware of the fact and decides to quit but knowing her as pregnant Inder stops and divulges the actuality to his mother when she collapses. Miserably, both Parvati and Sharda depart leaving Inder alone. Here, destiny makes them meet along with a newborn child at Haridwar when Sharda recognizes her mother-in-law, serves her, and also informs Inder. By the time, he arrives Sharda moves to commit suicide when Inder rescues her. At last, Parvati realizes the righteousness of Sharda and accepts her as the daughter-in-law. Finally, the movie ends on a happy note.

Cast
Jeetendra as Indra Malhotra
Rameshwari as Sharda
Usha Kiran as Indra Malhotra's mother
Sarika as Anita Kohli
Raj Babbar as Suryakant
Kalpana Iyer as Sharda's Friend
Jagdeep as Jagdish
Dina Pathak as Tara		
Om Prakash	as Tara's Husband
Madan Puri	as Mr. Kohli
Pinchoo Kapoor as Mr. Chokshi

Soundtrack 
Music: Laxmikant–Pyarelal

Lyricist: Anand Bakshi

References

1980s Hindi-language films
Films scored by Laxmikant–Pyarelal